Acquitted is a 1929 American melodrama directed by Frank R. Strayer, from a screenplay by Keene Thompson. The film stars Lloyd Hughes, Margaret Livingston, and Sam Hardy, and was released by Columbia Pictures on November 15, 1929.

Plot
Marian is sent to prison for a crime she did not commit. While there she meets fellow convict, Dr. Bradford, who has also been wrongly convicted of a murder. Marion believes his innocence and falls in love with him. Bradford tells her that it was Egan who framed him. Meanwhile, Egan has fallen in love with Marian, and when Marian is paroled, begins to woo her. She goes along with his romances, hoping to get the info she needs to free Bradford. However, Egan is warned of her intentions by associates who are still in the jail. When Egan confronts Marian, she admits her plan, but tells Egan of her love for Bradford.

Egan, pretending to help Marian out, agrees to get Bradford released, and pays one of his henchmen, Smith, to confess to the crime for which Bradford is in prison for. Once Bradford is released, Egan attempts to leverage his role in that release, to force Marian to marry him. When she refuses, he has Bradford kidnapped, intending to have him killed. Learning of it, an armed Marian confronts Egan, and when he refuses to divulge Bradford's whereabouts, she shoots him. Grievously wounded, Egan needs immediate medical attention. Regretting her action, she pleads with Egan to tell him where Bradford is, so that he can tend to the wound.

Once Egan tells her where he has Bradford stashed, Marian rushes to free him, returning to Egan, where Bradford tends to the gunshot wound. The woman and doctor are followed by the police, who overhear Egan confessing to the murder for which Bradford was originally convicted. The wound patched, Egan is taken to jail, while Bradford and Marian end up together.

Cast list
 Lloyd Hughes as Dr. Bradford
 Margaret Livingston as Marian
 Sam Hardy as Egan
 Charles West as McManus
 George Rigas as Tony
 Charles Wilson as Nelson
 Otto Hoffman as Smith
 Erville Alderson as Prison Warden (uncredited)

Production
In early September 1929, it was announced that Frank Strayer had been slated to direct the picture. In late August it was announced that Lloyd Hughes, Margaret Livingston, and Sam Hardy were attached to the project.  With Lloyd Hughes and Margaret Livingston already cast in the lead roles, Charles Wilson and Otto Hoffman were added to the cast in early October. The film was released on November 15, 1929.

Reception
Harrison's Reports gave the film a positive review, calling it a "strong melodrama", although they found the moral of the story less than desirable, saying that "it glorifies a crook and a murderer". They felt the script and direction created an atmosphere of tense suspense. They particularly singled out the acting work of Sam Hardy. The Motion Picture News also enjoyed the film, calling it a "Good Crime Drama". They complimented Lloyd Hughes and Margaret Livingston, while saying that they were outshone by Hardy, although they felt the plot was a bit hackneyed.

References

External links

Columbia Pictures films
Films directed by Frank R. Strayer
Melodrama films
1929 drama films
1929 films
American drama films
American black-and-white films
1920s English-language films
1920s American films